The Prince's Bay station is a Staten Island Railway station in the neighborhood of Prince's Bay, Staten Island, New York.

History 
The station opened on June 2, 1860, as Lemon Creek, with the opening of the Staten Island Railway from Annadale to Tottenville. Prior to being placed in an open-cut the station consisted of a small platform connected to a small station house, which was connected to a two-story house. The platform could be reached by going up a short staircase.

Station layout
The station is located near Seguine Avenue and Amboy Road on the main line, and is located is in an open-cut with two side platforms, green canopies, and walls of steel and concrete. A railroad spur leading to the St. George-bound tracks also exists just outside of this parking lot. Maps do not show the station name with apostrophe while the station signs do. The latter is the historically correct (and official) name. This station was the last all-timber platform on the line before being replaced in the early 1990s.

Exits
There is an exit/entrance on the south end of each platform that allows access to Seguine Avenue. An exit/entrance on the northern end of the St. George (north) bound platform allows access to a small free commuter park & ride lot that is accessible from Herbert Street.

References

External links

Staten Island Railway station list
Staten Island Railway general information
 Seguine Avenue entrance from Google Maps Street View
 Platform level from Google Maps Street View

Staten Island Railway stations
Railway stations in the United States opened in 1860
1860 establishments in New York (state)
Prince's Bay, Staten Island